No Return is a 2010 Spanish-Argentine thriller drama film directed by Miguel Cohan which stars Leonardo Sbaraglia, Martín Slipak and Bárbara Goenaga alongside Federico Luppi.

Plot 
The plot tracks the developments after a cyclist (Pablo) is hit by a car with young Matías and Chaucha inside. Pablo's father Víctor looks for witnesses and ventriloquist Federico eventually gets wrongfully jailed.

Cast

Production 
Shooting locations included Buenos Aires and Alicante.

Release 
The film premiered in Argentine theatres on 30 September 2010. It entered the Valladolid International Film Festival's main competition on 27 October 2010, followed by a theatrical release in Spain on 18 February 2011, distributed by Alta Classics.

Reception 
Fernando López of La Nación gave a positive review ("good"), writing that the "solid debut" film by Miguel Cohan featured "no gimmicks, no appeals to easy emotion, no sobering speeches, no underlinings", and "no manichaeism in the portrayal of characters", whereas the elaborate screenplay (perhaps "overly elaborate") deals with the likes of "guilt, hypocrisy, individualism, irresponsibility".

Jonathan Holland of Variety considered that the story "is explored with sensitivity and craft" , "built around a carefully worked-out script", underpinning a "strong calling card for debut helmer Miguel Cohan".

Javier Ocaña of El País considered the film to be a "powerful dramatic thriller that deals with all angles of an unintentional criminal event", featuring a "superb use of ellipses" and "good performances".

Accolades 

|-
| rowspan = "7" align = "center" | 2010 || 55th Valladolid International Film Festival || colspan = "2" | Golden Spike ||  || align = "center" | 
|-
| rowspan = "6" | 5th Sur Awards || colspan = "2" | Best Debut Film ||  || rowspan = "6" | 
|-
| Best Original Screenplay || Ana Cohan, Miguel Cohan || 
|-
| Best Actor || Leonardo Sbaraglia || 
|-
| Best Supporting Actress || Ana Celentano || 
|-
| Best Supporting Actor || rowspan = "2" | Martín Slipak || 
|-
| Best New Actor || 
|}

See also 
 List of Argentine films of 2010
 List of Spanish films of 2011

References

External links 
 No Return at ICAA's Catálogo de Cinespañol

2010 thriller drama films
Films shot in Buenos Aires
Films shot in the province of Alicante
Argentine thriller drama films
Spanish thriller drama films
2010s Spanish-language films
Tornasol Films films
2010s Spanish films
2010s Argentine films